Limit  is a 2022 South Korean crime thriller film directed by Lee Seung-Jun, starring Lee Jung-hyun, Moon Jeong-hee, Choi Deok-moon and Park Myung-hoon.
The film revolves around life safety policewoman So-eun, who as an undercover officer plays the mother of a serial kidnapping victim, faces the extreme crisis while solving the worst kidnapping ever case. It was released on August 31, 2022.

Cast
 Lee Jung-hyun as So-eun, a police officer from the Life Safety Department, playing role of a mother of serial kidnapping victim 
 Moon Jeong-hee as Hye-jin, a friendly elementary school health teacher during the day, but a vicious villain
 Jin Seo-yeon as Yeon-joo, a strong mother, who is the starting point of a child serial kidnapping case
 Choi Deok-moon as Seong-chan, a detective in the homicide squad 
 Park Myung-hoon as Joon-yong, a maniac with a ruthless personality and a member of a criminal group 
 Park Kyung-hye as Myeong-seon, vicious villain duo with Joon-yong
 Oh Min-suk as Lee Cheol-woo, a diplomat and husband of Yeon-joo
 Cha Hee as Seon-mi
 Kim Ha-eon as Won-ho
 Lee Ji-hyun as Hyo-eun
 Jeon Guk-hyang as mother of So-eun
 Lim Cheol-hyung as Park Hyuk-jun, University Hospital Specialist

Production
Lee Jung-hyun, Moon Jeong-hee and Jin Seo-yeon were cast in main leads of the film. Oh Min-seok joined the cast in August 2020. In July 2020, Park Myung-hoon confirmed to appear in the film.

Principal photography began on July 10, 2020, and the filming was wrapped up on September 27, 2020.

Production presentation was given on July 14, 2022 at Lotte Cinema Konkuk University in Gwangjin-Gu, Seoul.

Release
The film was scheduled to be released on August 17, but on August 3, the date was advanced to August 31, 2022. It has runtime of 87 minutes.

Reception

Box office
The film was released on August 31 on 684 screens.

, it is at the 28th place among Korean film released in 2022 with gross of US$489,554 and 68,097 admissions.

Critical response
Kim Na-yeon writing in Star News wrote, "Limit is a film for maternal love by and for maternal love." Appreciating performances of the cast Kim wrote, "performances of the actors are flawless." Concluding she stated, "In particular, Limit is a worthwhile movie in that it tried an action thriller with three female actors as the main characters." Ko Jae-wan of Sports Chosun also praised the performances of female cast but criticised the story writing, "the biggest weakness of Limit seems to be the story line." Concluding Ko opined, "Limit is a meaningful work just because it is a female action thriller movie that has been out for a long time after breaking through the corona era." Lee Yoo-chae of Cine21 wrote, "Limit, has clear goal as it concentrates only on the process of mother rescuing her child." Lee opined that in the film villain character was not fully expressed, which reduced "the completeness of the film". Concluding, Lee stated, "The flow is often interrupted by presenting only the situation without considering the context before and after."Cine21

References

External links
 
 
 

2022 films
2022 crime thriller films	
2020s Korean-language films
2020s South Korean films
South Korean crime thriller films
Films about child abduction